Macrotona securiformis, the Inland Macrotona, is a species of short-horned grasshopper in the family Acrididae, first described by in 1921 by Bror Yngve Sjöstedt, as Eumacrotona securiformis. It is found in Australia.

References

External links

 

Catantopinae
Taxa named by Bror Yngve Sjöstedt
Insects described in 1921